Arab Telemedia Group is an independent commercial media enterprise, founded by Adnan Al Awamleh in 1983.

Arab Telemedia creates and produces quality multiplatform content and since its establishment has been evolving to become on the forefront of TV productions in the middle east, in addition, Arab Telemedia distributes its own content in different formats assuring highest qualities. Apart from producing and distributing, Arab Telemedia is the foremost entity that provides  Production facilities and services ready to support film makers and production houses from different scopes to different drives.

Over the past 30 years, it became one of the leading production companies in the Arab world, Arab Telemedia Group produced more than 5000 hours of drama programming, mostly aired on major TV broadcasters across the region achieving top viewership ratings.

In the year 2000, Talal Al Awamleh became the CEO for Arab Telemedia, accomplishing a great growth successes in the years after, crowned with an Emmy award in 2008 for its socio-political series Al Ijteyah "The Invasion" as best international telenovela.

Television series 
Arab Telemedia Group has produced a significant number of popular Arabic TV Titles, below are some of these titles:

Awards and recognition

References 

Television production companies of Jordan
Mass media companies established in 1983
1983 establishments in Jordan